Rhipsalis is a genus of epiphytic flowering plants in the cactus family, typically known as mistletoe cacti. They are found in parts of Central America, the Caribbean and northern regions of South America. They also inhabit isolated locations in Africa and Asia, and are the only cactus group naturally occurring in the Old World. This is the largest and most widely distributed genus of epiphytic cacti (those which live on other plants without damaging them).

The scientific name Rhipsalis derives from the Ancient Greek term for wickerwork, referring to the plants' morphology.

Description
The morphology of Rhipsalis is very variable. The plants can grow mostly pendent, few grow more or less upright or sprawling. There are three main stem shapes: terete, angular and flattened. The stems are succulent, but the degree of succulence varies between the species. Some have very thick stems (e.g. Rhipsalis neves-armondii), whereas other have very thin, filiform stems (e.g. Rhipsalis baccifera, Rhipsalis clavata). In the majority of species, spines are missing or occur only in the juvenile stage (this is most prominent in Rhipsalis dissimilis). Rhipsalis pilocarpa has stems and fruits densely covered by bristles, making this species easily distinguishable from all other Rhipsalis.
The flowers are borne lateral or apical and are actinomorphic with a varying number of perianth segments, stamens and carpels. They are small, usually about 1 cm in diameter, white or whitish in most species. Yellowish flowers occur in R. dissimilis and R. elliptica and R. hoelleri is the only Rhipsalis species with red flowers. The fruits are always berries, they are whitish or coloured pink, red or yellow. Vivipary has been observed in R. micrantha and R. baccifera.

Taxonomy

The genus was described by Joseph Gaertner in 1788. But when he described the plant, he had in fact not realised it was a cactus. Instead, he assumed he had found a new species of Cassytha, a parasitic laurel from a completely different plant family.

Species
In the taxonomic treatment in The New Cactus Lexicon, 35 species were accepted, divided into five subgenera (Phyllarthrorhipsalis, Rhipsalis, Epallagogonium, Calamorhipsalis, Erythrorhipsalis). A molecular study in 2011 showed the paraphyly of three subgenera as previously circumscribed (Rhipsalis, Calamorhipsalis and Epallagogonium). So a new subgeneric classification of Rhipsalis with only monophyletic subgenera Rhipsalis, Calamorhipsalis and Erythrorhipsalis was proposed. Species accepted by Plants of the World Online  are listed below, with subgeneric placements, where given, based on Calvente (2012).

Distribution and habitat 
Rhipsalis is found as pendulous epiphyte in tropical rainforests, some species may also grow epilithic or, rarely, terrestrial. The genus is found widely in Central America, parts of the Caribbean and a great part of northern and central South America. The center of diversity of Rhipsalis lies in the rainforests of the Mata Atlantica in southeastern Brazil. It is found throughout the New World, and additionally in tropical Africa, Madagascar and Sri Lanka. It is the only cactus with a natural occurrence outside the New World.

Notes

References

Literature

 
Epiphytes
Cacti of South America
Cacti of North America
Cactoideae genera